Ihor Petrovych Vartsaba (born 28 January 1991) is a Ukrainian professional football goalkeeper who plays for Skoruk Tomakivka.

External links 
Profile on Official Dnipro Website

 

1991 births
Living people
Ukrainian footballers
FC Dnipro players
FC Naftovyk-Ukrnafta Okhtyrka players
SC Dnipro-1 players
FC Metalurh Zaporizhzhia players
FC Peremoha Dnipro players
FC Skoruk Tomakivka players
Ukrainian Premier League players
Ukrainian First League players
Ukrainian Second League players
Association football goalkeepers
Footballers from Dnipro